"Little Jackie Wants to Be a Star" is a song recorded by Lisa Lisa and Cult Jam that appeared on their 1989 album Straight to the Sky. Released as a single, it reached number 29 on the Billboard Hot 100 and number three on the R&B chart. In the UK, it peaked at number 90.

Charts

References

1989 singles
Lisa Lisa and Cult Jam songs
1989 songs
Columbia Records singles
Song recordings produced by Full Force